Mei Lam Estate is a public housing estate in Tai Wai, Sha Tin District, New Territories, Hong Kong, located on both sides of Tai Wai Nullah (sometimes referred to as the upper stream of Shing Mun River) and near Mei Chung Court, May Shing Court and the Shing Mun Tunnels.

Description
The estate consists of 4 residential buildings, a shopping centre and a sports centre. It is divided into 3 phases. Phase 1 (Mei Fung House, Mei Yeung House, Mei Tao House and Mei Lam Shopping Centre) are located at the south side of Tai Wai Nullah, while Phase 2 (Mei Wai House) and Phase 3 (Mei Lam Sports Centre) are located at the north side. The two sides are connected by a footbridge. The estate comprises a total 4,100 rental flats, of sizes ranging from 10.8 m2 to 64.7 m2.

Mei Lam Estate Phase 1 and Mei Lam Sports Centre won the Certificate of Merit and the Silver Medal of HKIA in 1982 and 1987 respectively.

Houses

Demographics
The authorised population was 11,400 as at end December 2007. It was 10,200 as at end September 2019. According to the 2016 Population By-census, the actual number of persons living in Mei Lam Estate was 9,879. 98% of the population was of Chinese ancestry. Median monthly domestic household income was HK$ 14,900.

May Shing Court

May Shing Court is a Home Ownership Scheme court located near Mei Lam Estate and Mei Chung Court. It has 3 residential blocks completed in 1984 and 1985 respectively.

Houses

Mei Chung Court

Mei Chung Court is a Home Ownership Scheme court located near Mei Lam Estate. It has 6 residential blocks completed in 1996.

Houses

See also
 Public housing estates in Tai Wai

References

Further reading

 Chuk, Lin-ping, "Reconnecting over nullah : community foci at Tai Wai", Postgraduate Thesis, Master of Architecture, University of Hong Kong, 1998

Residential buildings completed in 1981
Residential buildings completed in 1982
Residential buildings completed in 1985
Public housing estates in Hong Kong
Tai Wai
1982 establishments in Hong Kong